Darmesteter is a surname. Notable people with the surname include:

 Agnes Mary Frances Duclaux (once Darmesteter) (1857–1944), English writer and scholar
Arsène Darmesteter (1846–1888), French philologist
James Darmesteter (1849–1894), French antiquarian